Stephanie Beatriz (born February 10, 1981) is an American actress. She is known for playing Detective Rosa Diaz in the Fox/NBC comedy series Brooklyn Nine-Nine (2013–2021), and voicing protagonist Mirabel Madrigal in the Disney film Encanto.

Early life
Beatriz was born in Neuquén, Argentina, to a Colombian father and a Bolivian mother. She is also of part German descent. She arrived in the United States at the age of two with her parents and a younger sister. Beatriz grew up in Webster, Texas, outside Houston, and attended Clear Brook High School. As a child, her mother took Beatriz and her sister to arts exhibits and events, something she credits for raising her awareness of potential careers in the arts. She became interested in acting after taking speech and debate as an elective, which allowed her to appear in plays. She became a United States citizen at 18.

Beatriz attended the all-women's Stephens College in Columbia, Missouri. After graduating in 2002, she moved to New York City to pursue acting. She has lived in Los Angeles since 2010.

Career
Beatriz had minor roles in the police procedural television series The Closer and Southland, and a recurring role as Gloria's sister Sonia in the ABC comedy series Modern Family.

In 2013, she began portraying Detective Rosa Diaz in the Fox and NBC series Brooklyn Nine-Nine, an action comedy series based around the members of a Brooklyn police precinct. In 2019, she directed the season 6 episode "He Said, She Said." The show ran for eight seasons.

Beatriz starred as Bonnie in the independent feature film The Light of the Moon, written and directed by Jessica M. Thompson. The film premiered at the 2017 South by Southwest Film Festival, where it won the Audience Award for Narrative Feature Competition. She received highly positive reviews for her performance, with The Hollywood Reporter stating that "Beatriz offers a powerful ... unflinching, authentic performance," while Variety noted that the film was "harrowingly effective" and Beatriz's performance was "expertly balanced and judged." From 2018 to 2019, she voiced the character Gina Cazador on BoJack Horseman.

It was announced in 2019 she would be appearing in the 2021 film adaptation of Lin-Manuel Miranda's Tony Award-winning musical In the Heights. She also voiced Mirabel Madrigal, the main character in the Disney animated film Encanto, making it her second collaboration with Miranda of the year.

In 2019, Beatriz and her Brooklyn Nine-Nine co-star Melissa Fumero were the masters of ceremonies at the National Hispanic Media Coalition Impact Awards.

In 2021, Beatriz voiced the lead role in the Texas Rangers-centered crime procedural podcast Tejana. She also serves as an executive producer for Tejana and,  was looking to develop a television series based on the characters. She also starred in the sci-fi thriller podcast Solar and hosted Wondery's Twin Flames podcast investigating a dating cult.

Personal life
Beatriz has severe astigmatism and requires glasses to see. She does not wear them in many of her roles; as her eyes are sensitive to contact lenses, she therefore has difficulty hitting her marks while on camera.

She has described herself as suffering from disordered eating, which she developed during college.

Sexuality and marriage
Beatriz first realized that she was bisexual around age 12 or 13. She experienced biphobia and bisexual erasure from family and friends. In June 2016, she publicly came out.

In October 2017, she announced her engagement to actor Brad Hoss. They got married on October 6, 2018. In June 2021, she announced her pregnancy, and her daughter was born in August 2021.

Filmography

Film

Television

Web

Podcasts

Theatre

Video games

Discography

Charted songs

Guest appearances

Notes

References

External links
 
 

1981 births
21st-century American actresses
American film actresses
American television actresses
American voice actresses
American people of Argentine descent
American people of Bolivian descent
American people of Colombian descent
Argentine people of Colombian descent
Argentine people of Bolivian descent
Actresses from Houston
Models from Houston
Argentine emigrants to the United States
Bisexual actresses
Hispanic and Latino American actresses
Argentine LGBT actors
LGBT Hispanic and Latino American people
Living people
People from Neuquén
Stephens College alumni
People with acquired American citizenship
American bisexual actors
Colombian American